Cancer Minor (Latin for "lesser crab") was a constellation composed from a few stars in Gemini adjacent to Cancer. The constellation was introduced in 1612 (or 1613) by Petrus Plancius.

The 5th-magnitude stars constituting Cancer Minor were HIP 36616, and 68, 74, 81 and 85 Geminorum, forming a faint natural arrow-shaped asterism. 

It is only found on a few 17th-century Dutch celestial globes and in the atlas of Andreas Cellarius. It was no longer used after the 18th century.

See also
Obsolete constellations

References

Former constellations
Constellations listed by Petrus Plancius
Dutch celestial cartography in the Age of Discovery
Astronomy in the Dutch Republic
1610s in the Dutch Republic